Pedum is a monotypic genus of bivalves belonging to the family Pectinidae. The only species is Pedum spondyloideum and it is the only genus in the tribe Pedini.

The species is found in the Indian and Pacific Ocean.

References

External links
 Dijkstra, H. H. (2013). Pectinoidea (Bivalvia: Propeamussiidae and Pectinidae) from the Panglao region, Philippine Islands. Vita Malacologica. 10: 1-108

Pectinidae
Taxa described in 1791